Rogério Skylab & Orquestra Zé Felipe (Portuguese for "Rogério Skylab & the Zé Felipe Orchestra") is a collaborative album between Brazilian musicians Rogério Skylab and Zé Felipe, a former bassist of now-defunct experimental rock act Zumbi do Mato. Self-released in 2009, it is the second collaboration between Skylab and Felipe (the first being Skylab's 2007 release Skylab VII, in which Felipe co-authored a handful of songs). Originally intended as a full-fledged collaboration between Skylab and Zumbi do Mato, after a series of creative divergences only Zé Felipe remained as collaborator. The album could be downloaded for free on Skylab's official website until it was taken down for unknown reasons.

In a Facebook post from October 22, 2015, Skylab announced that a second installment was on the works, but no further news emerged since then.

"Tem Cigarro Aí?" would be re-recorded ten years later for Skylab's album Crítica da Faculdade do Cu; "Marcha Fúnebre" eleven years later for Cosmos; and "A Gente Vai Ficar Surdo" thirteen years later for Caos e Cosmos, Vol. 2.

Track listing

Personnel
 Rogério Skylab – vocals, production
 Zé Felipe – bass guitar, piano (track 6), mixing, mastering
 Bruno Coelho, Vinícius Costa – drums
 Pedro Sucupira – sax
 Luiz Henrique Magalhães – trombone
 Lucas Pereira Benevides – melodica
 Vinícius Pinho – keyboards (tracks 2, 3 and 7)
 Kayo Luiz – keyboards (tracks 1, 4, 5, 8, 9 and 10)
 Solange Venturi – cover art

References

2009 albums
Collaborative albums
Rogério Skylab albums
Self-released albums
Obscenity controversies in music